Virginia Paul Holm Bye (March 14, 1902 – October 1968) was a Minnesota politician, a member of the Republican Party, and the first woman to serve as Secretary of State of Minnesota.

Holm was appointed to the position in 1952 by Gov. Elmer Anderson. She succeeded H.H. Chesterman, who had himself previously been appointed to fill the vacancy left by the death of Holm's husband, former Secretary of State Mike Holm.

Holm won election in her own right in November 1952, but lost her bid for re-election in 1954. Her name on the ballot was Mrs. Mike Holm.

References

1902 births
1968 deaths
Secretaries of State of Minnesota
Minnesota Republicans
Women in Minnesota politics
20th-century American politicians
20th-century American women politicians